Nihattin Koca (born 1 January 1966) is a Turkish cross-country skier. He competed in the men's 15 kilometre event at the 1984 Winter Olympics.

References

1966 births
Living people
Turkish male cross-country skiers
Olympic cross-country skiers of Turkey
Cross-country skiers at the 1984 Winter Olympics
People from Sarıkamış